Gunstock Mountain is the second highest peak in the Belknap Mountains of central New Hampshire with an elevation greater than 2240 feet (683 m). It is home to the Gunstock Mountain Resort ski area. The ski resort has been written up in national ski magazines for its views of Lake Winnipesaukee.

Gunstock Mountain stands within the watershed of the Merrimack River, which drains into the Gulf of Maine in Massachusetts. The east side of the mountain, on which the ski resorted is located, drains into Poorfarm Brook, then into Lake Winnipesaukee, the Winnipesaukee River, and the Merrimack. The west side of the mountain drains into the Gunstock River, then into Lake Winnipesaukee.

References

External links 
  "Gunstock Mountain Hiking Guide". FranklinSites.com

Mountains of New Hampshire
Mountains of Belknap County, New Hampshire